Philip Wright (born 1967, Belize City) was appointed the bishop of the Anglican Diocese of Belize in 2005.  He attended Wesley College and Belize Technical College before teaching at Nazareen High School and at the Belize Technical College. After studying at Codrington College, he was ordained as a priest in 1993. He is the incumbent of St. Andrew's Anglican Church (San Ignacio). 

In September 2022, he was elected as one of eight presidents of the World Council of Churches, at the 11th WCC Assembly, held in Karlsruhe, Germany. In this role, he represents the region of the Caribbean and Latin America.

References

External links 

 Official Belizean biography
 press release

1967 births
Living people
21st-century Anglican bishops in the Caribbean
Anglican bishops of Belize